For the state pageant affiliated with Miss Teen USA, see Miss Arkansas Teen USA
 
The Miss Arkansas' Teen competition is the pageant that selects the representative for the U.S. state of Arkansas in the Miss America's Teen pageant. 

Ka'Mya Tackett of Sherwood was crowned Miss Arkansas' Outstanding Teen on June 17, 2022 at the Robinson Center in Little Rock, Arkansas. She competed for the title of Miss America's Outstanding Teen 2023 at the Hyatt Regency Dallas in Dallas, Texas on August 12, 2022 where she was a Teens in Action finalist.

In January of 2023, the official name of the pageant was changed from Miss Arkansas' Outstanding Teen, to Miss Arkansas’ Teen, in accordance with the national pageant.

Results summary
The following is a visual summary of the past results of Miss Arkansas' Outstanding Teen titleholders presented in the table below. The year in parentheses indicates year of the Miss America's Outstanding Teen competition in which the placement and/or award was garnered.

Placements

 2nd runners-up: Sloane Roberts (2009), Laura Leigh Turner (2013)
 4th runners-up: Dorothy Shepard (2007)
 Top 10: Hannah Joiner (2006)
 Top 12: Aubrey Elizabeth Reed (2018)

Awards

Preliminary awards
 Preliminary Evening Wear/On Stage Question: Hannah Joiner (2006), Dorothy Shepard (2007), Sloane Roberts (2009)
 Preliminary Lifestyle and Fitness: Hannah Joiner (2006), Dorothy Shepard (2007)
 Preliminary Talent: Sloane Roberts (2009), Laura Leigh Turner (2013), Gracie Stover (2016)

Non-finalists awards
 Non-finalist Evening Wear/On Stage Question: Gracie Stover (2016)
 Non-finalist Interview: Ashton Yarbrough (2015)

Other awards
 Miss Photogenic: Ashton Campbell (2012)
 Outstanding Achievement in Academic Life: Camille Cathey (2019)
 Teens in Action Award Winners: Emily Brewer (2017)
 Teens in Action Award Finalists: Gracie Stover (2016), Ka'Mya Tackett (2023)

Winners

References

External links
  Official website

Arkansas
Arkansas culture
Women in Arkansas